The Kasbah of Tifoultoute is a kasbah in Ouarzazate Province, Morocco located  west of the city of Ouarzazate.

History 
This fortress belonged to the family of Thami El Glaoui, Pasha of Marrakech from 1912 to 1956.

Gallery

References 

Tifoultoute
Forts in Morocco
Buildings and structures in Drâa-Tafilalet